Xyonysius californicus, the California false chinch bug, is a species of seed bug in the family Lygaeidae. It is found in the Caribbean Sea, Central America, North America, and South America.

Subspecies
These two subspecies belong to the species Xyonysius californicus:
 Xyonysius californicus alabamensis (Baker, 1906)
 Xyonysius californicus californicus (Stal, 1859)

References

Further reading

 

Lygaeidae
Articles created by Qbugbot
Insects described in 1859